The 2020 WNBA season is the 22nd season for the Minnesota Lynx of the Women's National Basketball Association. The season began on July 26, 2020, versus the Connecticut Sun.

This WNBA season will feature an all-time high 36 regular-season games. However, the plan for expanded games was put on hold on April 3, when the WNBA postponed its season due to the COVID-19 pandemic. Under a plan approved on June 15, the league is scheduled to hold a shortened 22-game regular season at IMG Academy, without fans present, starting on July 24.

The Lynx' season started strongly, as the team won five of their first six games, with their only loss coming to the Seattle Storm.  They won three of the next five to hold a 8–3 record at the halfway mark of the season.  The team finished the season with a 3–2 stretch of five games and a 3–3 stretch of the last six games.  Their overall 14–8 record earned them the fourth seed in the playoffs.

As the fourth seed, the Lynx earned a bye into the Second Round.  They faced off against the Phoenix Mercury, and won a very close game 80–79.  With that win, they advanced to face Seattle in the Semifinals.  The Lynx lost the first game in the series by two points, and then were defeated by ten points and twenty-one points in games two and three.  The three game sweep ended the Lynx' season.

Transactions

WNBA Draft

Trades/Roster Changes

Roster

Game log

Regular season

|- style="background:#bbffbb;"
| 1
| July 26
| Connecticut Sun
| W 77–69
| Sylvia Fowles (17)
| Sylvia Fowles (18)
| Damiris Dantas (5)
| IMG AcademyNo In-Person Attendance
| 1–0
|- style="background:#fcc;"
| 2
| July 28
| Seattle Storm
| L 66–90
| Damiris Dantas (18)
| Sylvia Fowles (11)
| Napheesa Collier (5)
| IMG AcademyNo In-Person Attendance
| 1–1
|- style="background:#bbffbb;"
| 3
| July 30
| Chicago Sky
| W 83–81
| Napheesa Collier (20)
| Napheesa Collier (10)
| Collier, Johnson (4)
| IMG AcademyNo In-Person Attendance
| 2–1

|- style="background:#bbffbb;"
| 4
| August 1
| Connecticut Sun
| W  78-69
| Sylvia Fowles (21)
| Sylvia Fowles (13)
| Napheesa Collier (4)
| IMG AcademyNo In-Person Attendance
| 3–1
|- style="background:#bbffbb;"
| 5
| August 5
| New York Liberty
| W 92–66
| Bridget Carleton (25)
| Carleton, Collier (7)
| Rachel Banham (5)
| IMG AcademyNo In-Person Attendance
| 4–1
|- style="background:#bbffbb;"
| 6
| August 7
| Indiana Fever
| W 87–80
| Lexie Brown (26)
| Brown, Fowles (6)
| Lexie Brown (9)
| IMG AcademyNo In-Person Attendance
| 5-1
|- style="background:#fcc;"
| 7
| August 9
| Los Angeles Sparks
| L 81-97
| Crystal Dangerfield (29)
| Damiris Dantas (7)
| Lexie Brown (6)
| IMG AcademyNo In-Person Attendance
| 5–2
|- style="background:#bbffbb;"
| 8
| August 11
| Washington Mystics
| W 68–48
| Sylvia Fowles (16)
| Sylvia Fowles (13)
| Crystal Dangerfield (4)
| IMG AcademyNo In-Person Attendance
| 6–2
|- style="background:#fcc;"
| 9
| August 13
| Las Vegas Aces
| L 77–87
| Napheesa Collier (21)
| Napheesa Collier (14)
| Damiris Dantas (7)
| IMG AcademyNo In-Person Attendance
| 6–3
|- style="background:#bbffbb;"
| 10
| August 15
| New York Liberty
| W 94-64
| Napheesa Collier (26)
| Napheesa Collier (13)
| Collier, Sims (5)
| IMG AcademyNo In-Person Attendance
| 7–3
|- style="background:#bbffbb;"
| 11
| August 19
| Dallas Wings
| W 91-84
| Crystal Dangerfield (21)
| Bridget Carleton (9)
| Crystal Dangerfield (6)
| IMG AcademyNo In-Person Attendance
| 8–3
|- style="background:#bbffbb;"
| 12
| August 21
| Phoenix Mercury
| W 90-80
| Napheesa Collier (20)
| Napheesa Collier (9)
| Collier, Carleton (6)
| IMG AcademyNo In-Person Attendance
| 9–3
|- style="background:#fcc;"
| 13
| August 23
| Atlanta Dream
| L 75–78
| Napheesa Collier (18)
| Damiris Dantas (9)
| Carleton, Dantas, Dangerfield (3)
| IMG AcademyNo In-Person Attendance
| 9–4
|- style="background:#bbffbb;"
| 14
| August 28
| Atlanta Dream
| W 88–79
| Crystal Dangerfield (23)
| Napheesa Collier (12)
| Odyssey Sims (9)
| IMG AcademyNo In-Person Attendance
| 10–4
|- style="background:#fcc;"
| 15
| August 30
| Phoenix Mercury
| L 79–83
| Crystal Dangerfield (20)
| Napheesa Collier (6)
| Odyssey Sims (5)
| IMG AcademyNo In-Person Attendance
| 10–5
|- style="background:#bbffbb;"
| 16
| August 31
| Los Angeles Sparks
| W 96–78
| Napheesa Collier (25)
| Collier, Dantas (9)
| Bridget Carleton (10)
| IMG AcademyNo In-Person Attendance
| 11–5

|- style="background:#bbffbb;"
| 17
| September 2
| Chicago Sky
| W 86–83
| Damiris Dantas (28)
| Napheesa Collier (9)
| Crystal Dangerfield (7)
| IMG AcademyNo In-Person Attendance
| 12–5
|- style="background:#bbffbb;"
| 18
| September 4
| Dallas Wings
| W 88–75
| Damiris Dantas (18)
| Napheesa Collier (14)
| Crystal Dangerfield (5)
| IMG AcademyNo In-Person Attendance
| 13–5
|- style="background:#fcc;"
| 19
| September 6
| Seattle Storm
| L 88–103
| Damiris Dantas (22)
| Damiris Dantas (9)
| Odyssey Sims (4)
| IMG AcademyNo In-Person Attendance
| 13–6
|- style="background:#fcc;"
| 20
| September 8
| Washington Mystics
| L 86–89
| Napheesa Collier (21)
| Napheesa Collier (11)
| Crystal Dangerfield (7)
| IMG AcademyNo In-Person Attendance
| 13–7
|- style="background:#fcc;"
| 21
| September 10
| Las Vegas Aces
| L 89–104
| Crystal Dangerfield (24)
| Napheesa Collier (11)
| Napheesa Collier (10)
| IMG AcademyNo In-Person Attendance
| 13-8
|- style="background:#bbffbb;"
| 22
| September 12
| Indiana Fever
| W 98–86
| Rachel Banham (29)
| Napheesa Collier (8)
| Rachel Banham (10)
| IMG AcademyNo In-Person Attendance
| 14–8

Playoffs 

|- style="background:#bbffbb;"
| 1
| September 17
| Phoenix Mercury
| W 80–79
| Damiris Dantas (22)
| Napheesa Collier (9)
| Napheesa Collier (6)
| IMG Academy
| 1–0

|- style="background:#fcc;"
| 1
| September 22
| Seattle Storm
| L 86–88
| Napheesa Collier (25)
| Napheesa Collier (9)
| Crystal Dangerfield (6)
| IMG Academy
| 0–1
|- style="background:#fcc;"
| 2
| September  24
| Seattle Storm
| L 79–89
| Damiris Dantas (23)
| Carleton, Dantas (7)
| Crystal Dangerfield (7)
| IMG Academy
| 0–2
|- style="background:#fcc;"
| 3
| September 27
| Seattle Storm
| L 71–92
| Napheesa Collier (22)
| Napheesa Collier (15)
| Dantas & Sims (4)
| IMG Academy
| 0–3

Standings

Playoffs

Statistics

Regular season

Awards and Milestones

References

External links

Minnesota Lynx seasons
Minnesota Lynx
Minnesota Lynx